Cecil Ralph Mountford  (16 June 1919 – 19 July 2009), also known by the nickname of "The Blackball Bullet", was a New Zealand rugby league footballer and coach.

Mountford was one of ten siblings, he and four of his brothers played rugby league for the South Island whilst Bill Mountford and Ken Mountford played for New Zealand. Mountford also played for West Coast, along with Bill and Ken, in inter-provincial matches.

Early years
Mountford played soccer at school, as he was considered too small to play rugby league. In 1935 at the age of 16 he joined Blackball Rugby League club, where he earned the nickname 'The Blackball Bullet' due to his speed on the field.

Player for Wigan
Mountford signed for Wigan Rugby League Club in 1946, he shared in one of Wigan’s finest moments in the 1949/50 campaign when, as captain – in place of usual captain Joe Egan who was on tour with seven other Wigan stars – he led his side to a sensational 20-2 Championship Final win over Huddersfield at Maine Road.

Mountford played at Wembley Stadium on two occasions, the first being in 1948, when they beat the current title holders Bradford Northern 8-3 in a nail biting final. The second visit, in 1951, Mountford led the team to a 10-0 victory over Barrow in a rain-soaked Wembley final. He also became the first overseas player to receive the Lance Todd Trophy.

Challenge Cup Final appearances
Cecil Mountford played  in Wigan's 8-3 victory over Bradford Northern in the 1947–48 Challenge Cup Final during the 1947–48 season at Wembley Stadium, London on Saturday 1 May 1948, in front of a crowd of 91,465.

County Cup Final appearances
Cecil Mountford played  in Wigan's 9-3 victory over Belle Vue Rangers in the 1946–47 Lancashire County Cup Final during the 1946–47 season at Station Road, Swinton on Saturday 26 October 1946, played  in the 14-8 victory over Warrington in the 1948–49 Lancashire County Cup Final during the 1948–49 season at Station Road, Swinton on Saturday 13 November 1948, played  in the 20-7 victory over Leigh in the 1949–50 Lancashire County Cup Final during the 1949–50 season at Wilderspool Stadium, Warrington on Saturday 29 October 1949, and played  in the 28-5 victory over Warrington in the 1950–51 Lancashire County Cup Final during the 1950–51 season at Station Road, Swinton on Saturday 4 November 1950.

International career
Internationally he missed out on playing for New Zealand, but he did represent Other Nationalities in two European Championships, in a team labeled "The Rest", in 1950, watched by a crowd of 25,000 fans. He requested, and was granted, permission from Wigan to join the 1947-8 New Zealand tour of Great Britain but the Management decided that injuries were not bad enough to bring him in. Instead, during the Kiwis tour Cecil played for Wigan against the Kiwis, which included his brother Ken.

Mountford was appointed head coach of the New Zealand team in 1979, leading the Kiwis on their 1980 tour of Great Britain and France and the 1982 tour of Australia and Papua New Guinea. New Zealand won 6 games, lost 8 and drew 1 under Mountford's coaching. He was replaced in 1983 by Graham Lowe.

Coaching at Warrington
In 1951 Mountford qualified as a first grade coach, being offered a 10-year contract at Warrington, despite Wigan initially refusing to release him as a player. Mountford made his first appearance for Warrington in October 1952 initially as a player coach.

Championship final appearances
Cecil Mountford was the coach in Warrington's 8-7 victory over Halifax the Championship Final during the 1953–54 season at Maine Road, Manchester on Saturday 8 May 1954, in front of a crowd of 36,519.

Challenge Cup Final appearances
Cecil Mountford was the coach in Warrington's 8-4 victory over Halifax in the 1953–54 Challenge Cup Final replay during the 1953–54 season at Odsal Stadium, Bradford on Wednesday 5 May 1954, in front of a record crowd of 102,575 or more. At the time, this was a world record attendance for a rugby match of either code.

After completing his tenure as a coach, he returned to New Zealand in May 1961, before heading back to England as Manager of Blackpool Borough in 1972, which was short-lived when he resigned in June 1973. Mountford returned to New Zealand in 1974, initially providing coaching courses before being signed as the manager-coach of the New Zealand national rugby league team from 1979 to 1982.

Honours
In the 1987 Queen's Birthday Honours, Mountford was appointed a Member of the Order of the British Empire, for services to rugby league and in 1990 he was inducted into the New Zealand Sports Hall of Fame. In 2000 he was inducted as one of the NZRL Legends of League.

Genealogical information
Cecil Mountford's marriage to Agnes E. (née Battersby) was registered during first ¼ 1948 in Wigan district. They had children; Carolyn E. Mountford (birth registered during third ¼  in Wigan district), and Christopher L. K. Mountford (birth registered during first ¼  in Runcorn district).

References

Further reading

External links
Statistics at wigan.rlfans.com
[/www.greystar.co.nz/index.php?option=com_content&task=view&id=3565&Itemid=42 Greymouth Star obituary]
The Independent obituary
Dominion Post obituary

1919 births
2009 deaths
Blackball players
Blackpool Borough coaches
Lance Todd Trophy winners
New Zealand Members of the Order of the British Empire
New Zealand national rugby league team coaches
New Zealand rugby league coaches
New Zealand rugby league players
Other Nationalities rugby league team players
Rugby league five-eighths
Warrington Wolves coaches
Warrington Wolves players
West Coast rugby league team players
Wigan Warriors captains
Wigan Warriors players
Rugby articles needing expert attention